Krzysztof Śmigiel (born 6 May 1974) is a Polish volleyball player. He competed in the men's tournament at the 1996 Summer Olympics.

References

External links
 

1974 births
Living people
Sportspeople from Szczecin
Polish men's volleyball players
Olympic volleyball players of Poland
Volleyball players at the 1996 Summer Olympics
AZS Częstochowa players
Czarni Radom players
AZS Olsztyn players
Gwardia Wrocław players